Greenwashing (a compound word modeled on "whitewash"), also called "green sheen", is a form of advertising or marketing spin in which green PR and green marketing are deceptively used to persuade the public that an organization's products, aims and policies are environmentally friendly. Companies that intentionally take up greenwashing communication strategies often do so in order to distance themselves from their own environmental lapses or those of their suppliers.

An example of greenwashing is when an organization spends significantly more resources on advertising being "green" than on environmentally sound practices. Greenwashing can range from changing the name or label of a product to evoke the natural environment (for example on a product containing harmful chemicals) to multimillion-dollar campaigns that portray highly-polluting energy companies as eco-friendly. Greenwashing covers up unsustainable corporate agendas and policies. Highly public accusations of greenwashing have contributed to the term's increasing use.

Many corporations use greenwashing to improve public perception of their brands. Complex corporate structures can further obscure the big picture. Critics of the practice suggest the rise of greenwashing, paired with ineffective regulation, contributes to consumer skepticism of all green claims and diminishes the power of the consumer to drive companies toward greener manufacturing processes and business operations.

Greenwashing has increased in recent years to meet consumer demand for environmentally-friendly goods and services. New regulations, laws, and guidelines by organizations such as the Committee of Advertising Practice mean to discourage companies from using greenwashing to deceive consumers.

Characteristics
TerraChoice, an environmental consulting division of UL, described "seven sins of greenwashing" in 2007 to "help consumers identify products that made misleading environmental claims":
 Hidden Trade-off: a claim that a product is "green" based on an unreasonably narrow set of attributes without attention to other important environmental issues.
 No Proof: a claim that cannot be substantiated by easily accessible information or by a reliable third-party certification. 
 Vagueness: a claim that is so poorly defined or broad that its real meaning is likely to be misunderstood by the consumer. "All-natural", for example, is not necessarily "green".
 Worshiping False Labels: a claim that, through words or images, gives the impression of a third-party endorsement where none exists. 
 Irrelevance: a claim that may be truthful but which is unimportant or unhelpful to consumers seeking environmentally-preferable products.
 Lesser of Two Evils: a claim that may be true within the product category, but that risks distracting consumers from the greater environmental impact of the category as a whole.
 Fibbing: a claim that is simply false.
The organization noted that by 2010 approximately 95% of consumer products in the U.S. claiming to be green were discovered to commit at least one of these sins.

History
Keep America Beautiful was a campaign founded by beverage manufacturers and others in 1953. The campaign focused on recycling and littering, diverting attention away from corporate responsibility to protect the environment. The objective was to forestall the regulation of disposable containers such as the one established by Vermont.

In the mid-1960s, the environmental movement gained momentum. This prompted many companies to create a new green image through advertising. Jerry Mander, a former Madison Avenue advertising executive, called this new form of advertising "ecopornography".

The first Earth Day was held on April 22, 1970. This encouraged many industries to advertise themselves as being friendly to the environment. Public utilities spent $300 million advertising themselves as clean green companies. This was eight times more than the money they spent on pollution reduction research.

The term greenwashing was coined by New York environmentalist Jay Westerveld in a 1986 essay about the hotel industry's practice of placing notices in bedrooms promoting reuse of towels to "save the environment". He noted that often little or no effort toward reducing energy waste was made by these institutions, although towel reuse saved them laundry costs. He concluded that often the real objective was increased profit and labeled this and other profitable-but-ineffective "environmentally-conscientious" acts as greenwashing.

In 1991, a study published in the Journal of Public Policy and Marketing (American Marketing Association) found that 58% of environmental ads had at least one deceptive claim. Another study found that 77% of people said the environmental reputation of a company affected whether they would buy its products. One-fourth of all household products marketed around Earth Day advertised themselves as being green and environmentally friendly. In 1998 the Federal Trade Commission created the "Green Guidelines", which defined terms used in environmental marketing. The following year the FTC found that the Nuclear Energy Institute's claims of being environmentally clean were not true. The FTC did nothing about the ads because they were out of the agency's jurisdiction. This caused the FTC to realize they needed new, clear, enforceable standards. In 1999 the word "greenwashing" was added to the Oxford English Dictionary.

Days before the 1992 Earth Summit in Rio de Janeiro, Greenpeace released the Greenpeace Book on Greenwash, which described the corporate takeover of the UN conference and provided case studies of the contrast between corporate polluters and their rhetoric. An expanded version of that report was published by Third World Network as "Greenwash: The Reality Behind Corporate Environmentalism."

In 2002, during the World Summit on Sustainable Development in Johannesburg, the Greenwashing Academy hosted the Greenwash Academy Awards. The ceremony awarded companies like BP, ExxonMobil, and even the U.S. Government for their elaborate greenwashing ads and support for greenwashing.

Examples

Fashion Industry 

 Kimberly Clark's claim of "Pure and Natural" diapers in green packaging. The product uses organic cotton on the outside but uses the same petrochemical gel inside as before. Pampers also claims that "Dry Max" diapers reduce landfill by reducing the amount of paper fluff in the diaper, which really is a way for Pampers to save money.
 In January 2020 the Fur Free Alliance noted that the "WelFur" label, which advocated for animal welfare on fur farms, is run by the fur industry itself and is aimed at European fur farms.
 Clothing company H&M came under fire for greenwashing their manufacturing practices as a result of a report published by Quartz News.

Food Industry 
 In 2009, McDonald's changed the color of its European logos from yellow-and-red to yellow-and-green; a spokesman explained that the change was "to clarify [their] responsibility for the preservation of natural resources". In October 2021 McDonald's was accused of greenwashing after announcing its pledge to reach net-zero emissions by 2050.
 In 2018, in response to increased calls to ban plastic straws, Starbucks introduced a lid with a built-in drinking straw that actually contained more plastic by weight than the old straw and lid together (though it can be recycled, unlike its predecessor).

Automobile Industry 
 In 1985, the Chevron Corporation launched one of the most famous greenwashing ad campaigns. Chevron's "People Do" advertisements were aimed at a "hostile audience" of "societally conscious" people. Two years after the launch of the campaign, surveys found people in California trusted Chevron more than other oil companies to protect the environment. In the late 1980s The American Chemistry Council started a program called Responsible Care, which shone a light on the environmental performances and precautions of the group's members. The loose guidelines of responsible care caused industries to adopt self-regulation over government regulation.
 The UK Advertising Standards Authority upheld complaints against major vehicle manufacturers including Suzuki, SEAT, Toyota, and Lexus who made false claims about their vehicles.
 Volkswagen fitted their cars with a "defeat device" which activated only when a car's emissions were being tested, to reduce polluting emissions. In normal use, by contrast, the cars were emitting 40 times the allowed rate of nitrogen oxide. Forbes estimates that this scandal cost Volkswagen US$35.4 billion.
 A 2010 advertising campaign by Chevron was described by the Rainforest Action Network, Amazon Watch, and The Yes Men as greenwash. A spoof campaign was launched to pre-empt Chevron's greenwashing.
 In November 2020, Aston Martin, Bosch, and other brands were discovered to have funded a report which downplayed electric vehicles' environmental benefits with misleading information about the CO2 emissions produced during the manufacture of electric vehicles, in response to the UK announcing that it would ban the sale of vehicles with internal combustion engines from 2030. The greenwashing scandal became known as Astongate given the relationship between the British automotive manufacturer and Clarendon Communications, a shell company posing as a public relations agency which was set up to promote the report, and which was registered to James Michael Stephens – the Director of Global Government & Corporate Affairs at Aston Martin Lagonda Ltd.

Political Campaigns 

 In 2010, environmentalists stated the Bush Administration's "Clear Skies Initiative" actually weakened air pollution laws. Similar laws were issued under President Macron of France as "simplifying ecology rules" that were criticized on similar grounds while still being referred to by his government as "ecology laws".
 "Clean Coal", an initiative adopted by several platforms for the 2008 U.S. presidential election, cited carbon capture and storage as a means of reducing carbon emissions by capturing and injecting carbon dioxide produced by coal power plants into layers of porous rock below the ground. According to Fred Pearce's Greenwash column in The Guardian, clean coal is the "ultimate climate change oxymoron… pure and utter greenwash". In 2017, Australia's then Treasurer Scott Morrison used "Clean Coal" as the basis to suggest clean energy subsidies be used to build new coal power plants.
 The renaming of "Tar Sands" to "Oil Sands", (Alberta, Canada) in corporate and political language reflects an ongoing debate between the project's adherents and opponents. This semantic shift can be seen as a case of greenwashing in an attempt at countering growing public concern about the environmental and health impacts of the industry. While advocates claim that the shift is scientifically derived to better reflect the use of the sands as a precursor to oil, environmental groups claim that it is simply a means of cloaking the issue behind friendlier terminology.
 In 2021, Saudi Arabian Crown Prince Mohammed bin Salman announced a tree planting campaign in the desert as part of the plan to reach carbon neutrality by 2060. The move was dubbed as "Greenwashing of the day" by British-Lebanese clean-energy entrepreneur Assaad W. Razzouk.
 Some environmental activists and critics condemned the 2021 United Nations Climate Change Conference (COP26) as greenwashing.

Business Slogans 

 "Clean Burning Natural Gas" — When compared to the dirtiest fossil fuel, coal, natural gas is only 50% as dirty. Producing natural gas through Fracking and/or distribution by a pipeline may lead to methane emissions into the atmosphere. Methane, the main component of natural gas, is a powerful greenhouse agent. Despite this, natural gas is often presented as a cleaner fossil fuel in environmental discourse. It is in practice used to balance the intermittent nature of solar and wind energy. It can be considered a useful "transitional technology" towards hydrogen as hydrogen can already be blended in and eventually be used to replace it, inside gas networks initially conceived for natural gas-use.
 First-generation biofuels are said to be better for the environment than fossil fuels, but some (such as palm oil) contribute to deforestation (which contributes to global warming due to release of CO2). Higher-generation biofuels do not have these particular issues, but have contributed significantly to deforestation and habitat destruction in Canada due to rising corn prices which make it economically worthwhile to clear-cut existing forests in agricultural areas.
 An article in Wired magazine highlighted slogans that suggest environmentally-benign business activity: the Comcast Ecobill has the slogan "PaperLESSisMORE", but Comcast uses large amounts of paper for direct marketing. The Poland Spring (from the American city of Poland) ecoshape bottle is touted as "A little natural does a lot of good", although 80% of beverage containers go to landfills. The Airbus A380 airliner is described as "A better environment inside and out" even though air travel has a high environmental cost.
 The multinational oil company formerly known as British Petroleum launched a rebranding campaign in 2000 revising the company’s acronym as “Beyond Petroleum”. The campaign included a revised green logo, advertisements, a solar-paneled gas station in Los Angeles, and clean energy rhetoric across media to strategically position itself as the ‘greenest’ global oil company. The campaign became the center of public controversy due to the company’s hypocrisy around lobbying efforts that sought permission to drill in protected areas, and its negligent operating practices that led to severe oil spills—most notably the Prudhoe Bay pipeline rupture in 2006 and the Gulf of Mexico rig explosion in 2010

Psychological effects 
Greenwashing is a relatively new area of research within psychology and there is little consensus among studies on how greenwashing affects consumers and stakeholders. Because of the variance in country and geography in recently published studies, the discrepancy between consumer behavior in studies could be attributed to cultural or geographic differences.

Effect on consumer perception 
Researchers found that products that are truly environmentally friendly are significantly more favored by consumers than their greenwashed counterparts. A survey by Lending Tree found that 55% of Americans are willing to spend more money on products they perceive to be more sustainable and eco-friendly.

Consumer perceptions of greenwashing are also found to be mediated by the level of greenwashing they are exposed to. Other research suggests that few consumers actually notice greenwashing, particularly when they perceive the company or brand as reputable. When consumers perceive green advertising as credible, they develop more positive attitudes towards the brand, even when the advertising is greenwashed.

Other research suggests that consumers with more green concern are more able to tell the difference between honest green marketing and greenwashed advertising; the more green concern, the stronger the intention not to purchase from companies from which they perceive greenwashing advertising behavior. When consumers use word-of-mouth to communicate about a product, green concern strengthens the negative relationship between the consumer's intent to purchase and the perception of greenwashing.

Research suggests that consumers distrust companies who greenwash because they view the act as deceptive. If consumers perceive that a company would realistically benefit from a green marketing claim being true, then it is more likely that the claim and the company will be seen as genuine.

Consumers’ willingness to purchase green decreases when they perceive the green attributes compromise the product quality, making greenwashing potentially risky, even when the consumer or stakeholder is not skeptical of the green messaging. Words and phrases often used in green messaging and greenwashing, such as "gentle", can lead consumers to believe the green product is less effective than a non-green option.

Attributions of greenwashing 
Eco-labels can be given to a product both from an external organization and by the company itself, which has raised concerns because companies can label a product green or environmentally friendly by selectively disclosing positive attributes of the product while not disclosing environmental harms. Consumers expect to see eco-labels from both internal and external sources but perceive labels from external sources to be more trustworthy. Researchers from the University of Twente found that uncertified or greenwashed internal eco-labels may still contribute to consumer perceptions of a responsible company, with consumers attributing internal motivation to a company's internal eco-labeling. Other research connecting attribution theory and greenwashing found that consumers often perceive green advertising as greenwashing when companies use green advertisements, attributing the green messaging to corporate self-interest. Green advertising can backfire, particularly when the advertised environmental claim does not match a company's actual environmental engagement.

Implications for green business 
Researchers working with consumer perception, psychology, and greenwashing note that in order for companies to avoid the negative connotations and perceptions of greenwashing, companies should "walk the walk" when it comes to green advertising and green behavior. Green marketing, labeling, and advertising are found to be most effective when it matches a company's actual environmental engagement. This is also mediated by the visibility of those environmental engagements, meaning that if consumers are unaware of a company's commitment to sustainability or environmentally-conscious ethos, they cannot factor greenness in their assessment of the company or product.

Significant exposure to greenwashing can make a consumer indifferent to or generate negative feelings toward green marketing. Genuinely green businesses then have to work harder to differentiate themselves from those who use false claims. Consumers may also react negatively to true sustainability claims because of negative experiences with greenwashing.

Deterrence
Companies may pursue environmental certification to avoid greenwashing through independent verification of their green claims. For example, the Carbon Trust Standard launched in 2007 with the stated aim "to end 'greenwash' and highlight firms that are genuine about their commitment to the environment".

There have been attempts to reduce the impact of greenwashing by exposing it to the public. The Greenwashing Index, created by the University of Oregon in partnership with EnviroMedia Social Marketing, allowed the public to upload and rate examples of greenwashing, but it was last updated in 2012.

Research published in the Journal of Business Ethics in 2011 shows that Sustainability Ratings might deter greenwashing. Results concluded that higher sustainability ratings lead to significantly higher brand reputation compared to lower sustainability ratings. This same trend was found regardless of the company’s level of corporate social responsibility (CSR) communications. This finding establishes that consumers pay more attention to sustainability ratings than CSR communications or greenwashing claims.

The World Federation of Advertisers released six new guidelines for advertisers in 2022 that aim to prevent greenwashing. These approaches encourage credible environmental claims and more sustainable outcomes.

Regulation
Worldwide regulations on misleading environmental claims vary from criminal liability to fines or just voluntary guidelines.

Australia
The Australian Trade Practices Act punishes companies that provide misleading environmental claims. Any organization found guilty of such could face up  in fines. In addition, the guilty party must pay for all expenses incurred while setting the record straight about their product or company's actual environmental impact.

Canada
Canada's Competition Bureau along with the Canadian Standards Association discourage companies from making "vague claims" about their products' environmental impact. Any claims must be backed up by "readily available data".

European Union
The European Anti-Fraud Office (OLAF) handles investigations that have an environmental or sustainability element, such as misspending of EU funds intended for green products and the counterfeiting and smuggling of products with the potential to harm the environment and health. It also handles illegal logging and smuggling of precious wood and timber into the EU (wood laundering).

In January 2021, the European Commission, in cooperation with national consumer protection authorities, published a report on its annual survey of consumer websites investigated for violations of EU consumer protection law. The study examined green claims across a wide range of consumer products, concluding that for 42 percent of the websites examined, the claims were likely false and misleading and could well constitute actionable claims for unfair commercial practices.

The European Union has also struck a provisional agreement to mandate new reporting rules for companies with over 250 staff and a turnover of 40 million euros. They will need to disclose environmental, social, and governance (ESG) information, which will help combat greenwashing. These requirements go into effect in 2024.

Norway
Norway's consumer ombudsman has targeted automakers who claim their cars are "green", "clean", or "environmentally friendly" with some of the world's strictest advertising guidelines. Consumer Ombudsman official Bente Øverli said: "Cars cannot do anything good for the environment except less damage than others." Manufacturers risk fines if they fail to drop misleading advertisements. Øverli said she did not know of other countries going so far in cracking down on cars and the environment.

Thailand 
The Green Leaf Certification is an evaluation method created by the Association of Southeast Asian Nations (ASEAN) as a metric that rates the hotels' environmental efficiency of environmental protection. In Thailand, this certification is believed to help regulate greenwashing phenomena associated with green hotels. Eco hotel or "green hotel" are hotels that have adopted sustainable environmentally-friendly practices in hospitality business operations. Since the development of the tourism industry in the ASEAN, Thailand superseded its neighboring countries in inbound tourism, with 9 percent of Thailand's direct GDP contributions coming from the travel and tourism industry in 2015. Because of the growth and reliance on tourism as an economic pillar, Thailand developed "responsible tourism" in the 1990s to promote the well-being of local communities and the environment affected by the industry. However, studies show the green hotel companies' principles and environmental perceptions contradict the basis of corporate social responsibilities in responsible tourism. Against this context, the issuance of the Green Leaf Certification aims at keeping the hotel industry and supply chains accountable for corporate social responsibilities in regard to sustainability by having an independent international organization evaluate a hotel and rate it one through five leaves.

United Kingdom
The Competition and Markets Authority is the UK's primary competition and consumer authority. In September 2021, it published a Green Claims Code intended to protect consumers from misleading environmental claims and to protect businesses from unfair competition.

United States
The Federal Trade Commission (FTC) provides voluntary guidelines for environmental marketing claims. These guidelines give the FTC the right to prosecute false and misleading claims. These guidelines are not enforceable but instead were intended to be followed voluntarily:
Qualifications and disclosures: The Commission traditionally has held that in order to be effective, any qualifications or disclosures such as those described in these guides should be sufficiently clear, prominent, and understandable to prevent deception. Clarity of language, relative type size and proximity to the claim being qualified, and an absence of contrary claims that could undercut effectiveness, will maximize the likelihood that the qualifications and disclosures are appropriately clear and prominent.
Distinction between benefits of product, package, and service: An environmental marketing claim should be presented in a way that makes clear whether the environmental attribute or benefit being asserted refers to the product, the product's packaging, a service, or to a portion or component of the product, package or service. In general, if the environmental attribute or benefit applies to all but minor, incidental components of a product or package, the claim need not be qualified to identify that fact. There may be exceptions to this general principle. For example, if an unqualified "recyclable" claim is made and the presence of the incidental component significantly limits the ability to recycle the product, then the claim would be deceptive.
Overstatement of environmental attribute: An environmental marketing claim should not be presented in a manner that overstates the environmental attribute or benefit, expressly or by implication. Marketers should avoid implications of significant environmental benefits if the benefit is in fact negligible.
Comparative claims: Environmental marketing claims that include a comparative statement should be presented in a manner that makes the basis for the comparison sufficiently clear to avoid consumer deception. In addition, the advertiser should be able to substantiate the comparison.

The FTC said in 2010 that it will update its guidelines for environmental marketing claims in an attempt to reduce greenwashing. The revision to the FTC's Green Guides covers a wide range of public input, including hundreds of consumer and industry comments on previously proposed revisions, offering clear guidance on what constitutes misleading information and demanding clear factual evidence. 

According to FTC Chairman Jon Leibowitz, "The introduction of environmentally-friendly products into the marketplace is a win for consumers who want to purchase greener products and producers who want to sell them." Leibowitz also says such a win-win can only operate if marketers' claims are straightforward and proven.

In 2013 the FTC began enforcing these revisions. It cracked down on six different companies; five of the cases concerned false or misleading advertising surrounding the biodegradability of plastics. The FTC charged ECM Biofilms, American Plastic Manufacturing, CHAMP, Clear Choice Housewares, and Carnie Cap, for misrepresenting the biodegradability of their plastics treated with additives.

The FTC charged a sixth company, AJM Packaging Corporation, with violating a commission consent order put in place that prohibits companies from using advertising claims based on the product or packaging being "degradable, biodegradable, or photodegradable" without reliable scientific information. The FTC now requires companies to disclose and provide the information that qualifies their environmental claims, to ensure transparency.

Related Terms 
Bluewashing is a term that describes deceptive marketing that overstates a company's commitment to responsible social practices. It focuses mainly on economic and community factors.

Carbon emission trading can be similar to greenwashing in that it gives an environmentally-friendly impression, but can be counterproductive if carbon is priced too low, or if large emitters are given "free credits". For example, Bank of America subsidiary MBNA offers "Eco-Logique" MasterCards that reward Canadian customers with carbon offsets when they use them. Customers may feel that they are nullifying their carbon footprint by purchasing goods with these, but only 0.5% of the purchase price goes to buy carbon offsets; the rest of the interchange fee still goes to the bank.

Greenscamming 
Greenscamming is when an organization or product takes on a name that falsely implies environmental friendliness. It is related to both greenwashing and greenspeak. This is analogous to aggressive mimicry in biology.

Greenscamming is used in particular by industrial companies and associations that deploy astroturfing organisations to try to dispute scientific findings that they consider threatening to their business model. One example is the denial of man-made global warming by companies in the fossil energy sector, also driven by specially-founded greenscamming organizations.

One reason to establish greenscamming organizations is that it is difficult to openly communicate the benefits of activities that damage the environment. Sociologist Charles Harper stresses that it would be difficult to market a group called "Coalition to Trash the Environment for Profit". Anti-environment initiatives therefore must give their front organizations deliberately deceptive names if they want to be successful, as surveys show that environmental protection has a social consensus. However, there is a danger of being exposed as an anti-environmental initiative, which entails a considerable risk that the greenscamming activities backfire and are counterproductive for the initiators.

Greenscamming organizations are active in organized climate denial. An important financier of greenscamming organizations was the oil company ExxonMobil, which financially supported more than 100 climate denial organizations and spent about 20 million U.S. dollars on greenscamming groups. James Lawrence Powell identified the "admirable" designations of many of these organizations as the most striking common feature, which for the most part sounded very rational. He quotes a list of climate denial organizations drawn up by the Union of Concerned Scientists, which includes 43 organizations funded by Exxon. None had a name that would lead one to infer that climate change denial was their raison d’être. The list is headed by Africa Fighting Malaria, whose website features articles and commentaries opposing ambitious climate mitigation concepts, even though the dangers of malaria could be exacerbated by global warming.

Examples 
Examples of greenscamming organizations include the National Wetlands Coalition, Friends of Eagle Mountain, The Sahara Club, The Alliance for Environment and Resources, The Abundant Wildlife Society of North America, the Global Climate Coalition, the National Wilderness Institute, the Environmental Policy Alliance of the Center for Organizational Research and Education, and the American Council on Science and Health. Behind these ostensible environmental protection organizations lie the interests of business sectors. For example, the National Wetlands Coalition is backed by oil drilling companies and real estate developers, while the Friends of Eagle Mountain is backed by a mining company that wants to convert open-cast mines into landfills. The Global Climate Coalition was backed by commercial enterprises that fought against government-imposed climate protection measures. Other Greenscam organizations include the U.S. Council for Energy Awareness, backed by the nuclear industry; the Wilderness Impact Research Foundation, representing the interests of lumberjacks and ranchers; and the American Environmental Foundation, representing the interests of landowners.

Another Greenscam organization is the Northwesterners for More Fish, which had a budget of $2.6 million in 1998. This group opposed conservation measures for endangered fish that restricted the interests of energy companies, aluminum companies, and the timber industry in the region, as well as tried to discredit environmentalists who promoted fish habitats. The Center for the Study of Carbon Dioxide and Global Change, the National Environmental Policy Institute, and the Information Council on the Environment funded by the coal industry are also greenscamming organizations.

In Germany, this form of mimicry or deception is used by the "European Institute for Climate and Energy" (EIKE), which suggests by its name that it is an important scientific research institution. In fact, EIKE is not a scientific institution at all, but a lobby organization that neither has an office nor employs climate scientists, but instead disseminates fake news on climate issues on its website.

See also

 
Astongate
Climate bond (green bond)
Coca-Cola Life
Conspicuous conservation
Dieselgate
Ecolabel
Ethics of philanthropy
False advertising
Fossil fuels lobby
Gasoline additives
Green brands
Green marketing
Green parking lot
Greenscamming
Reputation laundering
Sportswashing
Sunshine unit

References

Further reading
Catherine, P. (n.d). Eco-friendly labelling? It's a lot of 'greenwash'. Toronto Star (Canada), Retrieved from Newspaper Source database.
 
 
 
Jenny, D. (n.d). New reports put an end to greenwashing. Daily Telegraph, The (Sydney), Retrieved from Newspaper Source database.
Jonathan, L. (n.d). Why 'greenwash' won't wash with consumers. Sunday Times, The, Retrieved from Newspaper Source database.
 
 
 
 
 
 
 Greenscamming. The Encyclopedia of World Problems and Human Potential.

External links

Roberts Environmental Center - ratings of corporate sustainability claims.

Greenwashing in Popular Culture and Art
What is Greenwashing, and Why is it a Problem?"
Streaming audio of a 2011 radio program on the subject of Green Marketing/Greenwashing—from CBC Radio.

 
Environmentalism
Green politics
Public relations terminology
Deception
Environmental social science concepts
1980s neologisms